Leith was a burgh constituency of the House of Commons of the Parliament of the United Kingdom from 1918 to 1950. The constituency elected one Member of Parliament (MP) by the first past the post system of election.

There was also an earlier Leith Burghs constituency, 1832 to 1918, and a later Edinburgh Leith constituency, 1950 to 1997.

Boundaries 

The Leith constituency was created under the Representation of the People Act 1918, and first used in the 1918 general election, to cover the burgh of Leith, in the county of Midlothian. The burgh was previously within the Leith Burghs constituency.

1918 boundaries were used also in the general elections of 1922, 1923, 1924, 1929, 1931, 1935 and 1945.

The burgh was merged into the city of Edinburgh in 1920, and for the 1950 general election, under the House of Commons (Redistribution of Seats) Act 1949, the Edinburgh Leith constituency was created as one of seven constituencies covering the city and the Midlothian burgh of Musselburgh.

Members of Parliament

Election results

Elections in the 1910s

Elections in the 1920s 

change and swing from 1924

Elections in the 1930s 

General Election 1939–40:
Another General Election was required to take place before the end of 1940. The political parties had been making preparations for an election to take place from 1939 and by the end of this year, the following candidates had been selected; 
Liberal National: Ernest Brown
Labour: James Hoy

Elections in the 1940s

See also 
 Politics of Edinburgh

Notes and references 

Leith
Historic parliamentary constituencies in Scotland (Westminster)
Constituencies of the Parliament of the United Kingdom established in 1918
Constituencies of the Parliament of the United Kingdom disestablished in 1950